Richard Roman (August 12, 1966 - April 16, 1992) was an actor and improvisational comedian from Philadelphia.  While attending Temple University, Roman began his career in comedy partnering with Paul F. Tompkins in Philadelphia at The Comedy Works.

In 1989, Roman moved to Chicago. There, he worked with the ImprovOlympic and was a founding member of the Upright Citizens Brigade. His comedic style was described as similar to Andy Kaufman, and noted for always being 'in character'.

Roman died at the age 26 on April 16th, 1992, after the taxi he was driving plunged into the Chicago River.

Notes

1966 births
1992 deaths
Male actors from Chicago
Accidental deaths in Illinois
American stand-up comedians
Road incident deaths in Illinois
20th-century American male actors
American sketch comedians
Comedians from Illinois
20th-century American comedians